Brissopsis luzonica is a species of sea urchins of the family Brissidae. Their armour is covered with spines. Brissopsis luzonica was first scientifically described in 1851 by Gray.

References 

Animals described in 1851
luzonica